Open Network for Digital Commerce, abbreviated ONDC, is a private non-profit Section 8 company established by the Department for Promotion of Industry and Internal Trade (DPIIT) of Government of India to develop open e-commerce. It was incorporated on 31 December 2021 with initial investment from Quality Council of India and Protean eGov Technologies Limited (formerly NSDL e-Governance Infrastructure Limited). ONDC is not an application, an intermediary, or software, but a set of specifications designed to foster open interchange and connections between shoppers, technology platforms, and retailers. Technological self reliance, demand for level playing field mainly from small retailers, lower the barrier of entry and discovery online, adoption of open digital ecosystem across key sectors and fixing the non-competitive behavior of big ecommerce firms like Amazon and Flipkart to capture the US$810 billion domestic retail market led to its creation. Designed to keep check on Big Tech companies from violating Consumer Protection (E-Commerce) (Amendment) Rules, 2021 due to concentration of market power by integrating them into an open-source decentralised network where data portability will break data silos while data interoperability will allow innovation.

History
On 5 July 2021, a nine-member Advisory Council was constituted by Department for Promotion of Industry and Internal Trade (DPIIT). The Quality Council of India (QCI) was tasked with incubating the ONDC based on open source methodologies using open specifications and network protocols. It will incorporates inventory, logistics, dispute resolution and is planning to cover 25% of domestic digital commerce within two years of launch. ONDC will unbundle delivery services so that customers can choose their own logistics provider. Till 26 October 2021, QCI established a team of experts and on-boarded some small and medium size industries as volunteers for project execution while DPIIT approved ₹10 crore as initial investment.

From November 2021 to March 2022, various public and private sector entities picked up stakes in ONDC by investing seed money to become early promoters. This includes Punjab National Bank (9.5% for ₹25 crore). State Bank of India (7.84% for ₹10 crore). Axis Bank (7.84%). Kotak Mahindra Bank (7.84%). BSE Investments (5.88%). Central Depository Services (6.78%). ICICI Bank (5.97% for ₹10 crore). Small Industries Development Bank of India (7.84% for ₹10 crore). On 23 March 2022, Common Service Centres (CSC) under Ministry of Electronics and Information Technology (MeitY) announced that it will promote ONDC for ecommerce and logictics in rural areas through 3 Lakh Grameen e-Stores. National Payment Corporation of India (NPCI) and National Stock Exchange of India (NSE) committed funding for ONDC as promoters. On 31 August 2022, Ministry of Finance and Reserve Bank of India (RBI) cleared NPCI to acquire 10% stake at ONDC by investing ₹10 crore. Bank of India acquired 5.56% stake by investing ₹10 crore. 

As of July 2022, more than 20 organisations have committed investment  into the project such as UCO Bank, HDFC Bank. Bank of Baroda etc. HDFC Bank acquired 7.84% stake of ONDC. In April, ONDC had received ₹157.5 crore for first stage of the project from 17 banks and financial institutions. For the pilot project, eSamudaay will help in dealing with consumer facing interface, Gofrugal Technologies supplied enterprise resource planning software, GrowthFalcons for digital marketing and SellerApp will help sellers with automation and provide digital insight on sales. On 9 August 2022, SIDBI signed memorandum of understanding (MoU) with ONDC to bring small industries on the network. To make transition to ONDC easier, Yes Bank is working with SellerApp for business enterprise customers.

As per Nandan Nilekani, the Account Aggregator Network (AAN) will work alongside ONDC which will allow everyone in the supply chain to access formal credit in an efficient manner. ONDC signed MoU with Jammu and Kashmir Trade Promotion Organization (JKTPO) on 25 August 2022 to increase eCommerce adaptation in Jammu and Kashmir. Union government is planning to integrate One District One Product scheme with ONDC. IDFC First Bank joined ONDC on 8 September 2022 and will push its current account holders to use the network for business transaction. During talks at Stanford University Piyush Goyal clarified that through ONDC India is interested in creating multiple unicorns instead of few trillion dollar eCommerce companies. ONDC signed MoU with Government of Madhya Pradesh on 22 November 2022 to increase local adoption, sprint programming and software development. ONDC will incorporate mobility, hospitality and travel sectors.

Pilot Phases
The pilot phase was launched on 29 April 2022 in five cities; New Delhi, Bengaluru, Bhopal, Shillong and Coimbatore. In April, Bengaluru based Woolly Farms received an order from buyer application Paytm. This was the first transaction on ONDC.

Restaurant management platform Petpooja partnered with marketing agency GrowthFalcons to onboard food and beverage brands on ONDC network. They help restaurants with discovery and demand analytics. On 5 May 2022, GrowthFalcons, Paytm and logistics company LoadShare successfully completed the first live cascaded transaction on ONDC. The delivery happened on Petpooja point of sale (PoS) terminal.

By August 2022 all systems will become operational. ONDC will start servicing 100 cities and will also open for wider public use in Bengaluru, New Delhi, Coimbatore, Bhopal and Shillong where pilot projects are ongoing. By the end of 2022, ONDC will go live at national level covering the entire country. ONDC expanded to Noida, Faridabad, Lucknow, Bijnor, Bhopal, Chhindwara, Kolkata, Pune, Chennai, Kannur, Thrissur, Udupi, Kanchipura, Pollachi, Mannar and Ramnathpuram on 18 July 2022.

ONDC activated ecommerce in agriculture domain on 20 June 2022 with National Bank for Agriculture and Rural Development (NABARD). ONDC is attempting to integrate all Agri-tech and Non Agri-tech ecommerce platforms into common network while these companies build solutions that can further accelerate the adoption and establish market linkage for Farmer Producer Organizations.

Government of Uttar Pradesh started actively promoting One District One Product (ODOP) scheme on ONDC. DPIIT will initiate integration of Union Government Ministries and various departments under State Governments with ONDC. The platform will try to rectify issues registered with National Consumer Helpline like delivery of wrong, defective, damaged goods, non-delivery or delayed delivery, failed refunds or violation of service agreements. Government is planning to leverage the incubators under Startup India Seed Fund Scheme (SISFS) to build applications for ONDC with vernacular language support for greater accessibility. ONDC restricted referral commission of sending a buyer to a shopper at 3% compare to 30% in major eCommerce platforms.

From 21 cities, the pilot phase moved to 51 cities by third week of August. The Economic Times reported that ONDC is facing teething troubles with respect to address and geolocation APIs. From September, Bengaluru will become the first city to get all user access. By 2024, ONDC is planning to bring 3 crore sellers and 30 crore shoppers on the network. On 31 August 2022, government announced that ONDC will move to beta-testing phase for general public. ONDC will charge fee from sellers for maintenance and development of the network.

Public beta 
The public beta was rolled out on 30 September 2022 in Bangalore Urban district. On the first day, LoadShare processed 100 orders. Paytm app faced issue over missing order option. There is also one order cancellation from merchant side. As per government, ONDC will charge 8-10% of the selling price of the product compare to 18-40% charged by Amazon and Flipkart. The commission rate is not fixed and will be decided by market forces. Small retailers are also less to fear that the platform will open dark stores. Restaurants will have access to customer data. From 15 October 2022, ONDC initiated outreach program for restaurants and cloud kitchens in Bengaluru. From December 2022, public beta will rollout in Delhi and Mumbai.

From March 2023, ONDC will start network-wide scoring of sellers. This network-wide rating will include elements of feedback regarding transactions and performance of the sellers including the extent of grievance resolution. As of 16 January 2023, ONDC completed 4,000 successful transactions as part of beta testing.

B2B e-commerce 

ONDC will start testing B2B commerce from December 2022. Network participants initiated ONDC process integration from November.

ONDC Advisory Council 
The primary role of the advisory council is to watch over ONDC implementation in the country. The members were selected based on their experience in fields such as technology, finance, commerce etc. Members included Nandan Nilekani co-founder of Infosys, Anjali Bansal founder of Avaana Capital, R S Sharma Chief Executive Office National Health Authority, Adil Zainulbhai Chairman of Quality Council of India and Capacity Building Commission, Arvind Gupta Co-founder and Head of Digital India Foundation, Dilip Asbe Managing Director and chief executive officer at National Payment Corporation of India, Suresh Sethi Managing Director and chief executive officer at National Securities Depository Limited, Praveen Khandelwal Secretary-General of Confederation of All India Traders and Kumar Rajagopalan Chief Executive Office at Retailers Association of India. Convener of the ONDC Advisory Council is Anil Agrawal Additional Secretary from Department for Promotion of Industry and Internal Trade under Ministry of Commerce and Industry. Some of the members are volunteers of ISPIRT. Supriyo Ghosh is the chief architect behind ONDC. 

As per ONDC Advisory Council, a total of seven apps that include one from buyer side, five from seller side and one from logistics service provider side completed cascaded transactions in the pilot phase for grocery, food and beverage segment using Beckn Protocol as of 23 June 2022 in all the five cities. ONDC Advisory Council tasked to increase awareness and initiate a pilot phase among offline traders, handicraft artisans to prioritise their on-boarding. From 24 June 2022, ONDC Advisory Council started working on network expansion, governance and upgrade for the platform before nationwide rollout.

Objectives
The major objectives include:

 ending monopolies of the platforms
 democratisation and decentralisation
 digitisation of the value chain
 standardisation of operations
 inclusivity and access for sellers, especially small and medium enterprises as well as local businesses
 increased efficiency in logistics
 more choices and independency for consumers
 ensured data privacy and confidentiality
 decreased cost of operation

It is compared to Unified Payments Interface (UPI).

Structure
The ONDC uses "free softwared methodology, open specifications and open network protocol". On the ONDC, the consumers and merchants can transact goods and services independent of platform or application. Beckn will provide the technology and specification layer on which ONDC will design the network policies, network trust, network grievance handling and network reputation system. ONDC plans on implementing dynamic pricing model, digitised inventory management and optimise the delivery cost to help reduce cost of doing business for everyone on the platform. ONDC will work on a hyper local search engine model based on GPS proximity data as default setting. The buyer can independently select the seller and logistics partner to complete the order.

Beckn Protocol 
The backend of the ONDC is built on Beckn Protocol, an open and interoperable protocol for decentralised digital commerce. Beckn Gateways provides anonymised aggregated data generated from the network. The interoperability achieved by unbundling packet transmission layer from experience layer so that the core of commercial transactions such as discovery, order booking, payment, delivery and fulfillment can happen in a standardised manner. It can be customised based on the requirement of customer and provider by taking modular approach. Beckn is not ecommerce specific and can be used in other area of digital public infrastructure like healthcare, mobility etc. 

Nandan Nilekani, Pramod Varma and Sujith Nair developed Beckn Protocol in partnership with ISPIRT. The project is supported by Beckn Foundation. Beckn brand is owned by Open Shared Mobility Foundation in which Nandan Nilekani is the sole investor. It facilitates the third layer of public digital infrastructure that is the digital transaction layer in an open digital ecosystem. This helps promote market competition and regulate anti-competitive behavior. The development came after failure of US standard bodies to set new standards and left it to Big Tech companies to solve the issue. Beckn Protocol is a substitute for and compatible with the similar protocols developed by US that are in use globally for transactions and sending information between computers. Success of UPI gave further impetus to develop more open-source ecosystem in other areas at national scale.

Industry Working Group 
Microsoft and Oracle Corporation are looking for partnership to supply technology solutions which can add value to base ONDC network by helping companies scale up their operations. They are part of an industry working group for developing buyers, sellers and logistics provider registry, network reputation index and online dispute resolution framework. To ease on-boarding process, Microsoft started providing sellers toolkit. Oracle is designing a neutral, transparent reputation index for sellers. Amazon is working with ONDC to digitise Kirana stores. Sequoia Capital, SoftBank Group and Indian Venture Capital Association started pushing portfolio companies they invested in to actively take part in ONDC. 

Microsoft announced that it is going to join ONDC to introduce social commerce in India and will also launch a shopping app for buyers to help them in price discovery. From August 2022 to January 2024, PhonePe will invest $15 million for developing ecommerce platform on the network. Amazon is exploring how to integrate with the network. Zoho Corporation will provide technical support and facilitate live chat among buyers and sellers.

Concerns 
Industry is raising concerns on the liability of network participants for consumer complaints and the implementation of ecommerce rules on various stakeholders. There is also pertaining questions regarding third-party network policy audits and whether it will include search algorithms. Experts are discussing how stakeholders can make sure that any entity developing both buyer and seller side app on ONDC must be stopped from gaming the system. Companies and ONDC are also trying to resolve the issue of network disruption liability and uptime guarantee. Private sector is waiting for traction before they make any big, long term investment on ONDC.

According to JM Financial, ONDC getting data, algorithms of customer buying behavior from larger e-commerce players is a challenge. ONDC framework limits data usage and storage which affects interoperability. As per CEO T Koshy, ONDC will not subsidize pricing for customers using shareholders money. Instead it will focus more on innovation and special value addition to product. Government told ONDC to prepare detail report on grievance redressal mechanism and submit it by the end of September 2022. The system needs to be robust and competitive. Third-party agency will handle Online Dispute Resolution (ODR) by checking digital trail left by individual orders. Customers can check complaint status and how many are resolved. It will involved in the final rating of the merchants. ONDC will record all complaints filed against a merchant which will be linked directly to the network-wide reputation index that tabulates percentages of complaints raised, resolved or not resolved, as well as those that consumers may choose to take to consumer courts. The draft ODR policy will published by an expert committee of NITI Aayog. ONDC dashboard will publish monthly statistics of complaints received by seller side apps. On 2 September 2022, ONDC invited public feedback on Issue and Grievance Management Structure (IGMS) resolving buyer and seller complaints. The mechanism will be similar to what non-profit company Sahamati uses for their Account Aggregator Network but much faster and traceable.

Acceptance 
As of 12 May 2022, Flipkart, Reliance Retail and Amazon started talks with ONDC officials. As Logistics Network Partners (LNP), Ekart and Dunzo joined ONDC. Paytm and PhonePe which is in advance stage of integration will act as Payment Network Partners (PNP) for ONDC. PhonePe planning to join ONDC both from buyers and sellers side. Till 15 May 2022, 24 ecommerce platforms are joining ONDC. Paytm Mall confirmed joining ONDC network with primary focus on exports. As of July 6, 200 sellers are active in grocery, and food and beverage category. To access ONDC, a seller has to join a seller platform. 

After the success of Tez atop Unified Payment Interface (UPI), Google initiated talks with ONDC to integrate Google Shopping with the platform.

FMCG companies and brands such as ITC Limited, Hindustan Unilever, Dabur and Nivea started talks on joining the network. Shopify also started showing interest on ONDC platform. Ecom Express and Shiprocket are at the final stages of integration as LNP. 

On 21 June 2022, National Restaurant Association of India (NRAI) initiated talks with officials from ONDC. Initially some large and small restaurants will join the network as pilot project and work on technology standardization. Restaurant Network Partners (RNP) under ONDC will help in on-boarding process and act as an aggregator. Post on-boarding, RNP will educate and train the restaurants on online delivery business, maintain packaging and hygiene norms and ensure that food preparation is as per service level agreements to protect consumer interest. Building consumer pipeline and delivery infrastructure will not come under RNP.

Products with geographical indicator tags, Khadi and those made by Scheduled Tribes will be promoted on the platform for national level market access and community development. Paytm from buyer side, GoFrugal, SellerApp, Growth Falcon, eSamudaay, Digiit from seller side and LoadShare from logistics side are successfully integrated with ONDC. Snapdeal will go live on ONDC by end of August 2022. It will deal on fashion, home and beauty, and personal care categories connecting 2,500 cities. The company will take help of LNP for last mile delivery. StoreHippo started testing of ONDC connected marketplace for small and medium-sized enterprises. Grab integrated as LNP for hyper local intercity delivery on 1 August 2022. As of August, Titan Company, Zoho Corporation, retail intelligence platform Bizom are on advance stages of integration with the network. IDBI Bank, India Post, Marico, Airtel are also interested in joining ONDC. Dunzo for Business (D4B) has joined ONDC as LNP on 4 August to provide last mile delivery for business to business (B2B) transaction.

By the end of August, SellerApp will onboard 3,000+ retail stores from Bengaluru. Livestream shopping platform Kiko Live will start operation from September 2022 starting with grocery, stationary items, medicine, gifts and novelty, flowers, fashion and cosmetics, electronics, electrical and hardware, dairy products and fresh meat. Innoviti Payment Solutions is integrating seller side app for small merchants on ONDC to publish their goods and offer credit to buyers. Business banking solution provider Zyro joined ONDC from seller side. They will help small retailers create digital stores on the network. Blowhorn integrated itself with ONDC as logistics network partner to perform last mile delivery and is in final phase of testing. They will go live from fourth week of September 2022. Menson will onboard 11,500 restaurants on ONDC. Crowdsourced third-party logistics platform Shadowfax integrated with ONDC on 19 October 2022. Kochi Open Mobility Network (KOMN) will integrate with ONDC to make transporters in Kerala discoverable on the network. On 23 November 2022, Meesho joined the network and started the pilot project in Bengaluru.

On 24 February 2023, Amazon announced integration of its logistics network and Smart Commerce Services with ONDC.

References

External links
 Official website

2021 establishments in India
Internet protocols
E-commerce in India
E-commerce websites